Chapadão do Sul is a municipality located in the Brazilian state of Mato Grosso do Sul. Its population was 25,865 (2020) and its area is 3,851 km².

References

External links

Municipalities in Mato Grosso do Sul